Demonassa is a genus of longhorn beetles of the subfamily Lamiinae.

Species 
Demonassa contains the following species:

 Demonassa albostictica (Breuning, 1974)
 Demonassa capitalis Blackburn, 1908
 Demonassa dichotoma (Newman, 1851)
 Demonassa marmorata Breuning, 1939

References

Zygocerini